Otto Dannebom (10 February 1904 – 5 November 1975) was a German politician of the Social Democratic Party (SPD) and former member of the German Bundestag.

Life 
In the first Bundestag election in 1949, he was directly elected to parliament in the constituency of Dortmund III - Lünen with 44.8% of the valid votes cast and defended his direct mandate in the 1953 election as well.

Literature

References

1904 births
1975 deaths
Members of the Bundestag for North Rhine-Westphalia
Members of the Bundestag 1953–1957
Members of the Bundestag 1949–1953
Members of the Bundestag for the Social Democratic Party of Germany